The Headland of Cape St. Francis is outer extremity marking the boundary of Conception Bay on the Avalon Peninsula of the island of Newfoundland in the Canadian province of Newfoundland and Labrador.

See also
Cape St. Francis (electoral district)
List of lighthouses in Canada
Pouch Cove

References

External links
 Aids to Navigation Canadian Coast Guard

Headlands of Newfoundland and Labrador
Cape St. Francis